Mutton Pulao is a dish fairly common in North Indian, South Indian and Pakistani and Turkish cuisine that incorporates mutton into a rice pilaf.

The rice used is almost invariably Basmati or a close variant. Even though Mutton Pulao resembles Mutton Biryani in many respects, there are subtle differences, apparent largely in the use of different set of spices.

See also

 List of lamb dishes
 Pakistani meat dishes

References

External links
Mutton Pulao Recipe 

Pakistani meat dishes
Indian meat dishes
North Indian cuisine
South Indian cuisine
Turkish cuisine
Lamb dishes